The 1974 New Zealand Open, also known as Benson and Hedges Open for sponsorship reasons, was a professional men's and women's tennis tournament held in Auckland, New Zealand. It was an independent event, i.e. not part of the 1974 Grand Prix or 1974 World Championship Tennis circuit. It was the seventh edition of the tournament and was played on outdoor grass courts from 7 January through 13 January 1974. Björn Borg and Evonne Goolagong won the singles titles.

Finals

Men's singles
 Björn Borg defeated  Onny Parun 6–4, 6–3, 6–1
 It was Borg's first singles title of his career.

Women's singles
 Evonne Goolagong defeated  Ann Kiyomura 6–3, 6–1

Men's doubles
 Syd Ball /  Bob Giltinan defeated  Ray Ruffels /  Allan Stone 6–1, 6–4

References

External links
 ATP – tournament profile
 ITF – tournament edition details

Heineken Open
ATP Auckland Open
January 1974 sports events in New Zealand
New